Late for the Sky Production Company is a U.S.-based board game production and manufacturing company based in Cincinnati, Ohio. They were founded in 1984. They manufacture games based on Monopoly.

History
Late for the Sky Production Company was started in 1984 by a Miami University of Ohio student started to create a Miami University campus version of Monopoly. The company then focused on expanding its products by keeping to college-themed versions. Later it expanded its product line to other themes.

Game line
The company's major product lines include "-opoly" games for nearly sixty major colleges and universities in the United States, and the "City in a Box" games, localized for major U.S. cities. They also have a line of specialty games, and produce custom games for other themes.

Late For The Sky also manufactures custom "-opoly" games for communities and businesses. These games include custom images on the box, board, cards, and money, along with tokens chosen by the customer.

Example games
America-in-a-box
 Cat-Opoly
Dog Breeds Line
Chihuahua-opoly
Pug-Opoly
Dachshund-opoly
City Line
Albuquerque-opoly
Boston-opoly
Buffalo-opoly
Chattanooga-opoly
"Chicago-in-a-box" - 1st Chicago Edition 
"Chicago-opoly" (2009) - 2nd Chicago Edition 
Cleveland-opoly
Chilliwack-opoly
Las Vegas-opoly
Nashville-opoly
New Orleans-opoly
Newport News-opoly
Omaha-opoly
Portland-opoly
Stephenville-opoly
Victorville-opoly
Wichita-opoly
Special Topics
Bacon-opoly
Bible-opoly
Brew-opoly
Geek-opoly
Fantasy-opoly
Fishin'-opoly
Wine-opoly
Universities
Auburnopoly (Auburn University)
Bamaopoly (University of Alabama)
Beaveropoly (Oregon State University)
Buckopoly (Ohio State University)
MSU-opoly (Mississippi State University)
Miami Opoly (Miami University of Ohio)
Purdue Opoly (Purdue University)
Hog-opoly (University of Arkansas)
Husker-opoly (University of Nebraska)
Virginia Techopoly (Virginia Tech)

References

External links
 

Board game publishing companies
Companies based in Ohio
American companies established in 1984
Monopoly (game)